The 1936 All-Big Ten Conference football team consists of American football players selected to the All-Big Ten Conference teams chosen by various selectors for the 1936 Big Ten Conference football season.

All Big-Ten selections

Ends
 Merle Wendt, Ohio State (AP-1; UP-1)
 Johnny Kovatch, Northwestern (AP-1; UP-1)
 Homer Harris, Iowa (UP-2)
 Matt Patanelli, Michigan (UP-2)

Tackles
 Ed Widseth, Minnesota (AP-1; UP-1)
 Charley Hamrick, Ohio State (AP-1; UP-1)
 DeWitt Gibson, Northwestern (UP-2)
 Ted Livingston, Indiana (UP-2)

Guards
 Steve Reid, Northwestern (AP-1; UP-1)
 Lester G. Schreiber, Northwestern (UP-1)
 Inwood Smith, Ohio State (AP-1; UP-2)
 Charles Schultz, Minnesota (UP-2)

Centers
 Ed Sayre, Illinois (AP-1; UP-1)
  George Svendsen, Minnesota (UP-2)

Quarterbacks
 Fred Vanzo, Northwestern (AP-1; UP-1)

Halfbacks
 Andy Uram, Minnesota (AP-1; UP-1)
 Don Heap, Northwestern (AP-1; UP-2)
 Vern Huffman, Indiana (UP-1)
 Bud Wilkinson, Minnesota (UP-2)

Fullbacks
 Cecil Isbell, Purdue (AP-1; UP-2 [halfback])
 Johnny Drake, Purdue (UP-1)
 Steve J. Toth, Northwestern (UP-2)

Key

AP = Associated Press

UP = United Press

Bold = Consensus first-team selection of both the AP and UP

See also
1936 College Football All-America Team

References

1936 Big Ten Conference football season
All-Big Ten Conference football teams